The Altman House is an historic house at 1202 Perry Street in Helena, Arkansas. It is a -story brick and stone structure, designed by Estelle Newman Altman as a residence for her family and built in 1914. It is a stylistically distinctive mixture of Classical Revival and Craftsman styling. It is roughly rectangular in plan, with an entry recessed behind a segmented-arch pediment supported by Ionic columns. The bays which flank the entry have casement windows filled with diamond panes and topped by transom windows. A sunporch extends the building to the right side.

The house was listed on the National Register of Historic Places in 1988.

See also
National Register of Historic Places listings in Phillips County, Arkansas

References

Houses on the National Register of Historic Places in Arkansas
Neoclassical architecture in Arkansas
Houses completed in 1914
Houses in Phillips County, Arkansas
National Register of Historic Places in Phillips County, Arkansas